Allison was launched in France in 1776, almost certainly under another name. The British captured her in 1795. Between 1796 and 1799 she made two whaling voyages to the Southern Whale Fishery. Then between 1799 and 1807 she made three voyages as a slave ship. Between the first and the second a French privateer captured her, but British letters of marque recaptured her. The British slave trade was abolished in 1807 and thereafter Allison traded primarily as a coaster. After about 1840 she began to trade to America and Africa. She was lost c.1846.

Career
Allison entered Lloyd's Register in 1795 with Masslin, master, Harvey & Co., owners, and trade Falmouth–Archangel. The entry noted that she was a French prize. The 1796 volume showed her master changing to Bernie and her trade to Bristol–Southern Fishery. It also showed her as being built in 1776.

Whaling voyages
1st whaling voyage (1796–1797): Captain James Birnie sailed from England in 1796, bound for the coast of East Africa. Allison was at Rio de Janeiro in April 1796. Allison, of Bristol, Bernie, master, was at the Cape of Good Hope on 8 November. She returned to England on 19 December 1797.

2nd whaling voyage (1796–1797): Captain Thaddeus Luce sailed from England in 1798. Allison returned to England on 15 February 1799.

Slaving voyages
1st slave trading voyage (1799–1800): Captain Jesse Topping acquired a letter of marque on 10 July 1799. He sailed from Liverpool on 26 August, bound for West Central Africa and St. Helena. Allison arrived in the West Indies n 14 July 1800, landing slaves at Martinique, but primarily at Kingston, Jamaica. In all she landed 375 slaves. She left Kingston on 10 October and arrived back at Liverpool on 23 December. She had left with a crew of 47 men and suffered 10 crew deaths on the voyage.

Capture and recapture: Between her first and second slave trading voyages, Allison sailed between Liverpool and Newfoundland. Captain Robert Burn acquired a letter of marque on 31 March 1801. Lloyd's List reported on 17 November 1801 that Allison had been captured while sailing from Newfoundland to the West Indies, but that  and  had recaptured her and sent her into Suriname. Both Beaver and Otter were slave ships sailing under letters of marque.

2nd slave trading voyage (1803–1805): Captain James Thompson acquired a letter of marque on 24 September 1803. He sailed from London 3 October. On 27 December she was at  when a gale took away her half her rudder and did other damage. In early January Allison was at Minehead with a pilot on board for Bristol. Allison had had to leave the convoy she was in and her escort and make for the nearest port. Allison was almost totally rebuilt in 1804.

Allison gathered her slaves at Accra and arrived at Demerara on 8 April 1805. There she disembarked 275 slaves. At some point M. Roberts replaced Thompson, and (John?) Marman replaced Roberts. She left for London on 11 May.

3rd slave trading voyage (1803–1805): Captain Diederick Woolbert sailed from London on 18 February 1806, bound for the Gold Coast. Allison gathered her slaves at Cape Coast Castle and Accra, and left Africa on 22 August. She arrived at Kingston, Jamaica, on 27 November. There she landed 186 slaves. She left Kingston on 17 May 1807, and arrived back at London on 18 July 1807.

Trading

On 14 May 1823 Allison, Dixon, master, was coming from Jarrow Steath into Newcastle when she got stuck in sand. She sustained so much damage that she had to transfer her cargo to Mercury, Campbell, master, in order to be able to go into the dock for repairs.

On 12 to 14 October 1824 Allison, Dixon, master, was at Hartlepool when a gale hit the coasts of England. She was one of many vessels driven on shore.

Fate
Lloyd's Register for 1846 carries the annotation "LOST" by Allisons name.

Notes and citations
Notes

Citations

1776 ships
Ships built in France
Captured ships
Age of Sail merchant ships of England
Whaling ships
London slave ships
Liverpool slave ships
Maritime incidents in October 1824
Maritime incidents in 1846